St. Nicholas' Church is a ruined church in Armen, Vlorë County, Albania. It is a Cultural Monument of Albania.

References

Cultural Monuments of Albania
Buildings and structures in Selenicë
Churches in Vlorë County